Josh Wood may refer to:

 Josh Wood (rugby league), English rugby league player
 Josh Wood (hairdresser), British hairdresser

See also
 Josh Woods (American football) (born 1996), American football player 
 Josh Woods (wrestler)